Timothy or Tim Carter may refer to:

 Timothy J. Carter (1800–1838), United States Representative from Maine
 Timothy Carter (cricketer) (born 1969), former English cricketer
 Tim Carter (basketball) (born 1956), former head basketball coach for the University of Texas at San Antonio
 Tim Carter (wide receiver) (born 1979), American football wide receiver
 Tim Carter (defensive back) (born 1978), American football defensive back 
 Tim Carter (musicologist) (born 1954), professor at the University of North Carolina
 Tim Lee Carter (1910–1987), member of the United States House of Representatives
 Tim Carter (footballer) (1967–2008), Sunderland goalkeeper and coach
 Tim Carter (soccer), American youth development manager
 Tim Carter (producer), co-producer of Sesame Street
 Timothy Carter (field hockey) (born 1944), New Zealand field hockey player
 Timothy Carter, a The Mentalist character